Periodically Saudi Arabia's Ministry of Interior publishes a most wanted list.
According to Asharq Alawsat Saudi Arabia has published four lists of "most wanted" suspected terrorists, and those lists contained 19, 26, 36 and 85 individuals.

The list of 85 most wanted suspected terrorists published in February 2009 named eleven former Guantanamo captives.

Earlier lists
On May 7, 2003, the Saudi Interior Ministry announced a list of 19 names who it said were planning to carry out subversive activities. On May 12, 2003 Riyadh compound bombings took place.

List of December 6, 2003
A list published on December 5, 2003 contained twenty-six names.
When a new list was published in February 2009 Carol Rosenberg, writing in the Miami Herald, reported that all, but one of the captives had been killed or captured.

{| class="wikitable sortable"
|+ December 6, 2003 list
|-
! rank || name || nation|-
| 1. || Abdulaziz Abdulmuhsin Almughrin || Saudi
|-
| 2. || Rakan Muhsin Mohammad Alsaykhan || Saudi
|-
| 3. || Khalid Ali Ali-Haj || Yemeni
|-
| 4. || Kareem Altohami Almojati || Moroccan
|-
| 5. || Salih Mohammad Awadallah Alalawy Aloafi || Saudi
|-
| 6. || Ibrahim Mohammad Abdullah Alrayis || Saudi
|-
| 7. || Saud Homood Obaid Alqotaini Alotaibi || Saudi
|-
| 8. || Ahmad Abdul-Rahman Saqr al-Fadhli || Saudi
|-
| 9. || Sultan Bjad So'doon Alotaibi || Saudi
|-
| 10. || Abdullah Saud Abunayan Alsobaie'e || Saudi
|-
| 11. || Faisal Abdulrahman Abdullah Aldakheel || Saudi
|-
| 12. || Faris al-Zahrani || Saudi
|-
| 13. || Khalid Mobarak Habeeb-Allah Alqurashi || Saudi
|-
| 14. || Mansoor Mohammad Ahmad Faqeeh || Saudi
|-
| 15. || Isa Saad Mohammad bin O'ooshan || Saudi
|-
| 16. || Talib Saud Abdullah Al Talib || Saudi
|-
| 17. || Mostafa Ibrahim Mohammad Mobaraki || Saudi
|-
| 18. || Abulmajeed Mohammad Abdullah Almoneea' || Saudi
|-
| 19. || Nasir Rashid Nasir Alrashid || Saudi
|-
| 20. || Bandar Abdulrahman Abdullah Aldakheel || Saudi
|-
| 21. || Othman Hadi Al Maqboul al-Amri || Saudi
|-
| 22. || Talal A'nbar Ahmad A'nbari || Saudi
|-
| 23. || A'amir Mohsin Moreef Al Zaidan Alshihri || Saudi
|-
| 24. || Abdullah Mohammad Rashid Alroshood || Saudi
|-
| 25. || Abdulrahman Mohammad Mohammad Yazji || Saudi
|-
| 26. || Hosain Mohammad Alhasaki || Moroccan
|}

List of June 28, 2005

The list of June 28, 2005 contained thirty-six names.
The Saudi government encouraged those named on the list to surrender, and promised lenient treatment.
By April 7, 2007 the Saudi government reported that twenty-three of those individuals had been killed or captured.

List of February 3, 2009
The most recently published list was published on February 3, 2009.
It listed 85 individuals, 83 of whom were Saudis, and two were from Yemen.
Carol Rosenberg, reporting in the Miami Herald, wrote that six of the men on the new most wanted list were former Guantanamo captives.
Robert Worth, reporting in the New York Times, wrote that fourteen Saudis, formerly held in Guantanamo, had fallen under suspicion of supporting terrorism following their release.
The men were all believed to be living outside of Saudi Arabia, some of them receiving militant training.
They were promised lenient treatment, and encouraged to turn themselves in at the nearest Saudi embassy.

Those on the new list include three Saudis who appeared in a threatening al Qaeda video:
Said Ali al-Shihri, Abu Hareth Muhammad al-Awfi and Nasir al-Wuhayshi, and another individual named Abdullah al-Qarawi.
Al-Wuhayshi claims he is the leader of Al-Qaida in the Arabian Peninsula.
Al-Shihri and Al-Awfi are former Guantanamo captives, and Al-Shihri stated he was Al-Wuyashi's deputy.

The Saudi Gazette reported that Saudi security officials identified an individual named Saleh Al-Qaraawi as the leader of Al Qaeda in Saudi Arabia.

An article published in Asharq Alawsat on February 6, 2009, noted the range in age among the suspects—from seventeen to fifty-two.
This article named Abdullah El Qarawi, who it described as the "most dangerous" individual on the list, as the leader of Al Qaeda operations in the Persian Gulf.
According to the article Abdullah El Qarawi is just 26 years old, and most of the individuals on the list are between 25 and 25.
The article listed the names and ages of fifteen other individuals.

Another article in the Asharq Alawsat identified other individual from the list, including: Abdullah al-Abaed—wanted for the assassination of a senior police official, and Mohamed Abul-Khair, one of Osama bin Laden's bodyguards, and one of his sons-in-law.

On February 7, 2009 the Saudi Gazette reported some details of some of the wanted men.
The article named seven men it identified as former Guantanamo captives, and five other most wanted suspected terrorists it did not identify as former Guantanamo captives.

{| class="wikitable sortable"
|+ Individuals said to be named on the February 2009 list
|-
! ISN || Rank || Age || Names || Notes
|-
| 71 || || 27 || Mish'al Muhammad Rashid Al-Shedocky ||
 Repatriated on May 14, 2003—one of the first captives to be repatriated.
 His repatriation was reported to have been part of an exchange of prisoners that resulted in the release of five United Kingdom citizens.
In 2014, AQAP indicated in a three-part documentary about the group's former deputy leader Said Ali al-Shihri’s life and death that al-Shedocky was dead by having the phrase "May Allah accept him" posted next to his name. The phrase is reserved for jihadists who have been killed in battle. The group did not provide any details on al-Shedocky's death.
|-
| 105 || || 31 || Adnan Muhammed Ali Al Saigh  ||
 Repatriated on May 19, 2006.
 The Saudi Gazette reported he is believed to have traveled to a neighboring country with his brother-in-law, fellow suspect and fellow former Guantanamo captive, Othman al-Ghamdi, leaving behind his wife and son.
|-
| 114 || || 23 || Yousuf Mohammed Mubarak Al Jubairi Al Shahri ||
 Possibly the brother in law of fellow suspect and former Guantanamo captive Sa'id Ali Jabir Al Khathim Al Shihri.
 Repatriated to Saudi Arabia on November 9, 2007.
 Killed in a firefight with Saudi police on October 18, 2009 together with Rayed Abdullah Salem Al Harbi.
|-
| 177 || || || Fahd Salih Sulayman Al Jutayli ||
 According to his mother he was living openly in Saudi Arabia just days prior to the publication of the most wanted list.
 Reported to have been killed by Yemeni security officials in September 2009.
|-
| 184 || || 35 || Othman Ahmad Othman al-Ghamdi  ||
 Repatriated on June 24, 2006.
 Worked as a car dealer following his release.
 The Saudi Gazette reported he is believed to have traveled to a neighboring country with his brother-in-law, fellow suspect and fellow former Guantanamo captive, Adnan Al-Sayegh, leaving behind his wife and son.
|-
| 185 || || 31 || Turki Mash Awi Zayid Al Asiri ||
 Rrepatriated to Saudi custody on November 9, 2007, with thirteen other men.
Name and age are a close match to former Guantanamo captive Turki Mash Awi Zayid Al Asiri.
|-
| 187 || || 32 || Murtadha al Said Makram  ||
Repatriated to Saudi Arabia on November 9, 2007.
Repatriated in spite of the annual review procedures recommending his continued detention.
|-
| 188 || || 34 || Jabir Jubran Al Fayfi ||
Identified as a former captive Jaber Al-Faifi
Repatriated  on February 21, 2007.
Repatriated in spite of the annual review procedures recommending his continued detention.
|-
| 192 || || 29 || Ibrahim Sulayman Muhammad Arbaysh ||
 Repatriated on December 14, 2006 with sixteen other men.
|-
| 333 || || 35 || Mohamed Atiq Awayd Al Harbi ||
Repatriated to Saudi Arabia on November 9, 2007.
Appeared in a threatening video from Al-Qaida in the Arabian Peninsula.
Also identified as Mohamed Atiq Awayd Al Harbi.
Repatriated in spite of the annual review procedures recommending his continued detention.
Reported to have turned himself in Saudi Authorities on February 18, 2009.
|-
| 372 || || 35 || Said Ali al-Shihri ||
Repatriated to Saudi Arabia on November 9, 2007.
Claimed he was the deputy leader of Al-Qaida in the Arabian Peninsula.
Repatriated in spite of the annual review procedures recommending his continued detention.
Killed in a drone strike in Yemen in 2013.
|-
| || || || Nasir al-Wuhayshi ||
Appeared in a threatening video from Al-Qaida in the Arabian Peninsula.
Claims he is the leader of Al-Qaida in the Arabian Peninsula.
|-
| || || 34 || Mohamed Abul-Khair ||
 Reported to be Osama bin Laden's son-in-law.
 Reportedly a link to Ramzi bin al-Shibh.
|-
| || || 16 or 17 || Abdullah Al Jebairi Al Shahri ||
Nephew of fellow suspect Yusuf Al Jebairi Al Shahri.
Reportedly smuggled into Yemen, by his uncle, to join al Qaida.
|-
| || || 20 || Baheij Al-Buheajy ||
|-
| || 29 || 20 || Rayed Abdullah Salem Al Harbi ||
 Killed in a firefight with Saudi police on October 18, 2009 together with Yussef Al Shihri.
|-
| || || 21 || Naif Mohamed Al Qahtani ||
|-
| || || 21 || Hamd Hussein Nasser Al Hussein ||
|-
| || || 22 || Hassan Ibrahim Hamd Al Shaban ||
|-
| || || 23 || Abdullah al-Asiri ||
 Attempted to assassinate Saudi Prince Muhammad bin Nayef with a suicide bomb.  Al Aseery told security officials he wanted to surrender, but asked to meet the Prince personally.
|-
| || || 26 || Saleh Al-Qaraawi ||
 Reportedly was the leader of Al Qaeda in Saudi Arabia.
 Also referred to as "Abdullah Al-Qaraawi."
 Described as the "most dangerous" individual on the list.
 Captured in Saudi Arabia on June 9, 2012 after being gravely injured in a drone strike in Pakistan.
|-
| || || 31 || Ahmed Abdullah Al Zahrani ||
|-
| || || 37 || Ibrahim al-Asiri ||
|-
| || 15 || 38 || Badr Al Oufi Al Harbi ||
|-
| || 43 || 39 || Abdullah Abdul-Rahman Al Harbi  ||
|-
| || || 52 || Hussein Abdu Mohamed ||
|-
| || || || Abdulmohsin Al-Sharikh ||
 The Saudi Gazette reports he is the brother to two former Guantanamo captives -- Abdulhadi Al-Sharikh and Abdulrazzaq Al-Sharikh.
|-
| || || || Abdullah Al-Juwair ||
 The Saudi Gazette reports he is the brother to Fahd Al-Juwair who was killed in a shootout with Saudi security officials, following an attempt to blow up a petroleum facility.  His brother Fahd was listed on and earlier most wanted list.
|-
| || 6 || || Ahmad Al-Shiha ||
 Was studying Shariah law at University, when he disappeared.
|-
| || || 31 || Aqil Al-Mutairi ||
 Disappeared unexpectedly three years ago—believed to have gone to Iraq.
|-
| || 60 || 27 || Faiz Al-Harbi ||
 Disappeared five months ago—had recently told his mother he was thinking of seeking an Islamic education outside of Saudi Arabia—but he hadn't said where.
 Also transliterated as Fayez Ghuneim Hameed Al-Hijri Al-Harbi.
|-
| || || || Qasim al-Raymi ||
One of the two Yemenis on the list.
Alleged to be linked to: "a plot targeting the U.S. ambassador in San'a."
|-
| || || || Obaida Abdul-Rahman Al Otaibi ||
 A journalist with Saudi Al-Jazirah;
 Attended Imam Mohamed Bin Saud University where he earned a degree in media;
 Attended the same high school as "Eisa Al-Awsham, a former Al Qaeda commander."
 Accused of "planning to target vital infrastructure within Saudi Arabia."
|-
| || 32 || || Sultan Radi al-Utaibi ||
 His family reports that he was killed fighting Americans in Baghdad in January 2007.
 The Saudi Interior Ministry assert DNA tests confirm he was killed in a skirmish with Yemeni security officials, on September 14, 2009.
|-
| || 47 || || Abdullah Mohammed Abdullah al-Ayad ||
 He was profiled as a deceased martyr in a propaganda video in 2008.
|-
| || || || Ahmed Owaidan Al-Harbi ||
 Reportedly captured in Yemen in early 2009, described as "wanted" by Saudi security officials.
|-
| || 73 || || Mohammed Otaik Owaid Al-Aufi Al-Harbi ||
|-
| || 26 || || Khaled Saleem Owaid Al-Luhaibi Al-Harbi ||
|-
| || || 34 || Abdullah Thabet ||
 Alleged to hold Osama bin Laden as a hero.
 Alleged to have entered "clandestine cells" that launched raids against "non-believers".
 Alleged to have written a novel entitled "The 20th hijacker" about his jihadist years.
|-
| || 61 || 31' || Fahd Raggad Samir Al-Ruwaili ||
 On March 26, 2009, Al-Arabiya television reported he surrendered to Saudi authorities.
 ABC News transliterates his name as "Fahad al-Ruwaily", and reports: "A news Web site close to the ministry said Thursday that al-Ruwaily was a key figure in al-Qaida training camps along Syria's border with Iraq."|-
| || || || Badr Mohammed Nasser al-Shihri ||
 Al-Shihri's surrender was reported on October 19, 2010.
 Al-Shihri was reported to have surrendered when he was living in Pakistan.
 The Associated Press reported that Saudi officials allowed al-Shihri to be released into the custody of his family, following his repatriation.
|}

List of January 2011
December 6, 2003 list

According to the Saudi Gazette, the list was published by Interpol on January 5, 2011.
They reported one of the wanted men was 18, 34 of the men were between 20 and 30, and the remaining 12 were between 30 and 40.
The list of 47 suspects included the following individuals:

Suspects who remain at large, or otherwise unaccounted for
Hani Al Mubarak, the flight student from Saudi Arabia, has been located by Kimberly Zechman Webster in Jeddah, Saudi Arabia. 

According to the Agence France Presse, the SPA News Agency reported on May 23, 2009, that three Saudis suspected of ties to Al Qaida returned to Saudi Arabia and turned themselves in to authorities.
The Arab News reported the identities of the three men were not made public, but that they had not been listed on the February 2009 most-wanted list.
The Saudi Gazette'' reported that only two of the men voluntarily surrendered and that the third man was captured in Yemen.

On October 19, 2010, when reporting the surrender of Jabir Jubran Al Fayfi and Badr Mohammed Nasser al-Shihri, the Associated Press asserted that 70 of the original 85 men named on the list remained at large or unaccounted for.

References

External links 

Fugitives wanted by Saudi Arabia
Most wanted lists
Terrorism-related lists
Most wanted suspected terrorists